Coole is a barony  in County Fermanagh, Northern Ireland. To its west lies Upper Lough Erne, and it is bordered by three other baronies in Northern Ireland: Knockninny to the west; Magherastephana to the north; and Clankelly. It also borders three baronies in the Republic of Ireland: Dartry to the east; Tullygarvey and Loughtee Lower to the south.

History
Coole is based upon the ancient territory of Cuil, which was frequently referred to as the residence of the O'Cassidys. The O'Cassidys became the head physicians of the Maguires, and the territory was a collateral or dynastic branch of the Maguires. In the Annals it appears as Cuil na nOirear, which may have applied to an old half-barony near Enniskillen.

List of main settlements
Newtownbutler
Wattlebridge

List of civil parishes

Below is a list of civil parishes in Coole:
Gallon (split with baronies of Clankelly and Knockninny)
Drummully (split with barony of Clankelly)

References

Baronies of County Fermanagh
County Fermanagh